The Sylver (SYstème de Lancement VERtical) is a vertical launching system (VLS) designed by DCNS and introduced in 2001.

Specifications

The basic unit of Sylver VLS is an eight-cell module fitted with two rows of 56 cm. missile cells surrounding the uptake for exhaust gas, and the specifications for different models are as follows:

 

The launcher comes in several variants, each distinguished by their height. A-35 and A-43 were developed for launching short range surface-to-air missiles, the A-50 for the long-range PAAMS air defense system, and the A-70 launcher for longer missiles such as the SCALP naval land attack cruise missile.

The launchers come in eight-cell modules, except A-35 available in four-cell modules, with each eight-cell module occupying  of deck space. Crotale NG (VT1) missiles can be quad-packed in one cell.

The primary application of the launcher has been the Aster. The Sylver, together with the Aster, is the primary component of the PAAMS naval anti-air warfare system. Using PAAMS, up to eight missiles can be launched in 10 seconds.

The French Navy has initiated studies to convert the SCALP EG cruise missile to be capable of launch from the Sylver. This missile, the SCALP Naval, would give France a land attack capability in the mould of the U.S. Tomahawk.

Usage

Future users

 2 x 8 Sylver VLS A50 will be used on Italian Navy Paolo Thaon di Revel class, Full and Light+ versions, five ordered to November 5, 2015 for commissioning begin 2022

 2 x 8 Sylver A50 will be used by French Navy on five Amiral Ronarc’h-class frigates for MBDA Aster 15/30 missiles.

 4 x 8 Sylver A50 will be used by the Hellenic Navy on each of the three FDI HN frigates for MBDA Aster 30 missiles.

 Sylver VLS A35 will be used on Royal Malaysian Navy on six s

 Sylver VLS A50 will be used on Qatari Emiri Navy vessels (1 x 8 on one LPD and 2 x 8 on four frigates), ordered on 16 June 2016 to Fincantieri for commissioning begin 2022

See also
 Mark 41 Vertical Launching System

References

External links
 Official DCNS website
 Naval Institute Guide re: quad-packing Crotale VT-1s.

French Navy technology
Ship-based missile launchers
Military equipment introduced in the 2000s